Jacin is a given name for both genders.  It is either Spanish in origin, and is a shortened form of Jacinta, meaning "Hyacinth", or a variation on the spelling of Jason, both ultimately from Greek.

Spanish feminine given names